Cherry Street 12 is a Georgian sitcom-comedy television series that aired on Rustavi 2 which the "Comedy Group" filmed in 2012. The series aired on PIKTV too - Russian Sound in 2012.

Plot
Nika and Mari are a young couple who live in Nika's sister's home with her father. Nika launches a new job in the distribution. Her wife admits she is not happy. Mari works in the brand store called "Style of Tata". Nika's sister has a small business. Ucha is Nika's employee and the detergent distributor. Shalva is the father of Mari and plays the violin very well.

Production
The Comedy Group created the decorations for TV Series, the shooting took place in four different locations in the pavilion, Nika and Mari's home, bedroom, office, and the bar.

Cast
 Goga Barbakadze - Nika
 Maia Doborjginidze - Tata
 Tatuli Edisherashvili - Nino
 Tamuna Nikoladze - Mari
 Kakha Jokhadze - Ucha
 Slava Nateladze - Shalva
 Giorgi Jikia - Goga
 Vano Kurasbediani - Levan
 Tiko Katamashvili - Liliko
 Nino Arsenishvili - Lana
 Tamta Imnashvili - Masho
 Ani Amilakhvari - Lizi

External links
 Cherry Street 12 Youtube

Comedy television series in Georgia (country)